Rex Edward Barney (December 19, 1924 – August 12, 1997) was a Major League Baseball pitcher for the Brooklyn Dodgers in 1943 and from 1946 through 1950.

As a teenage phenom, Barney was signed by the Dodgers at the age of 18, in 1943. He pitched 45 innings that year.

Enlisting in the Army in 1943, Barney eventually served in Europe, receiving 2 Purple Hearts and the Bronze Star Medal.

Barney returned to the majors in 1946. He was one of the hardest throwers in the league but struggled with wildness early in his career. In 1948, however, he gained control of his fastball and had his greatest season; he won 15 games and finished second in the National League with 138 strikeouts. The highlight was hurling a no-hitter against the New York Giants on September 9. He had to sit through a one-hour rain delay and showers in the 7th, 8th, and 9th innings to finish the game. The next season, Barney pitched semi-effectively while suffering lingering effects from a leg injury suffered while sliding into second base.

Barney appeared in 3 games in the 1947 World Series – starting and losing the fifth game – against the New York Yankees. He got knocked out early in his 1949 World Series start, also against the Yankees, after just 2 innings. In 1950, he walked 48 batters in just 33 innings and never played in the majors again. He ended his career with a 35–31 record and a 4.31 earned run average.

After his retirement as a player, Barney briefly worked as a broadcaster, calling games for Mutual radio in 1958. That same year he also teamed with Al Helfer to call several Philadelphia Phillies games on New York station WOR-TV, helping to fill that city's void of National League baseball following the departure of the Dodgers and Giants to the West Coast.

Barney also teamed with Ted Patterson in 1982 and 1983 to cablecast 16 Baltimore Orioles games per year on the SuperTV channel.

PA announcer
Rex Barney was the PA announcer for the Baltimore Orioles from 1969 until his death in 1997. He was famous for often using the phrase "Give that fan a contract!" when a fan snared a foul ball on the fly. However, if the fan misplayed the ball, Barney would intone, "Give that fan... an error!"  This was an expansion on the old radio and TV announcers' comment, "Sign him up!" He would also end every announcement with his signature "Thank youuuuu."

Barney's famous "Thank youuuuu" were the last words to come over the PA system at Memorial Stadium after the Orioles' last game there on October 6, 1991. Barney was in the hospital at the time, and the message was recorded from there and played over the PA system to end the Orioles' tenancy.

Barney co-authored (with Norman L. Macht) two books about his life in baseball, Rex Barney's Thank Youuuu for 50 Years of Baseball and Orioles Memories: 1969–1994. He had become famous as an announcer, but to the end of his life, Barney always regretted his failure to last as a major league pitcher:
Believe me, there isn't a day that goes by that I don't think about what I could and should have been. It still hurts.

–Barney in 1992

Rex Barney died on August 12, 1997. In tribute to him, the Orioles game that day was held without a public address announcer.

See also
List of Major League Baseball no-hitters

References

External links

1924 births
1997 deaths
Baseball players from Nebraska
Brooklyn Dodgers players
Durham Bulls players
Fort Worth Cats players
Major League Baseball broadcasters
Major League Baseball pitchers
Major League Baseball public address announcers
Montreal Royals players
Philadelphia Phillies announcers
National Football League public address announcers
Professional Basketball League of America players
Sportspeople from Omaha, Nebraska
St. Paul Saints (AA) players
United States Army personnel of World War II